Vice Admiral Mohan Wijewickrama, RSP, VSV, USP (born 12 June 1953) is a former Sri Lankan senior naval officer turned politician. He served as the Chief of Staff of the Sri Lanka Navy from 2001 to 2005. He was appointed Governor of North Eastern Province from 2006 to 2007 and Governor of Eastern Province from 2007 to 2015, while serving as acting Governor of Northern Province. He is the current Sri Lankan High Commissioner to Pakistan.

Education
Wijewickrama was educated at Thurstan College.

Naval career
After completing his education, he joined the Sri Lanka Navy on 1 August 1971. During his career in the Navy he had served as the Deputy Commander, Western Naval Area (1993–1995); Deputy Commander, Northern Naval Area (1995–1996); Commander, Southern Naval Area (1996–1998); Commander, Eastern Naval Area (1998–2000); Commander, Northern Naval Area (2000–2001). From 2001 to 2005 he functioned as the Chief of Staff of the Sri Lanka Navy. He retired from the service in 2005 with the rank of Rear Admiral, when he was overlooked for the position of the Commander of the Navy by then president Chandrika Kumaratunga. In 2019 President Maithripala Sirisena corrected the injustice that occurred to him in 2005, by bestowing him with the rank of Vice Admiral from the date of retirement.

Political career
Wijewickrama was appointed as Governor of North Eastern Province on 21 January 2006, by President Mahinda Rajapaksa. With the de-merger of the two Provinces, he was appointed as the Governor of the Eastern Province in December 2006, the appointment he held till the election defeat of President Rajapaksa 2015. He was appointed as the co-chair for the District Development Committees (DDC) for Ampare, Batticaloa and Trincomalee. He was an active member of Viyathmaga a professional organisation that supported President Gotabaya Rajapaksa's presidential campaign in 2019. He was appointed as the Sri Lankan High Commissioner to Pakistan in June 2020.

Awards
His awards and decorations include the Medals; Rana Sura Padakkama (RSP), Vishista Seva Vibhushanaya (VSV), Uttama Seva Padakkama (USP), Sri Lanka Armed Services Long Service Medal, Riviresa Campaign Services Medal and Republic of Sri Lanka Armed Services Medal.

Family
Wijewickrama is married to Nishani and has a son and a daughter.

References

External links
 Eastern Provincial Council Governor's Secretariat 

|-

|-

|-

1953 births
Living people
High Commissioners of Sri Lanka to Pakistan
Governors of North Eastern Province, Sri Lanka
Governors of Northern Province, Sri Lanka
Governors of Eastern Province, Sri Lanka
Sri Lankan vice admirals
Sinhalese military personnel
Alumni of Thurstan College